"The Home You're Tearin' Down" is a song written by Betty Sue Perry that was originally recorded by American country artist Loretta Lynn. It was released as a single in August 1965 via Decca Records.

Background and reception 
"The Home You're Tearin' Down" was recorded at the Columbia Recording Studio on March 4, 1965. Located in Nashville, Tennessee, the session was produced by renowned country music producer Owen Bradley. Three additional tracks were recorded during this session, including the single's B-side, "Farther to Go". 

"The Home You're Tearin' Down" reached number ten on the Billboard Hot Country Singles survey in 1965. The song became her fourth top ten single under the Decca recording label. "The Home You're Tearin' Down" was also the fourth song Lynn recorded that was composed by Betty Sue Perry. It was included on her studio album, I Like 'Em Country (1966).

Track listings 
7" vinyl single
 "The Home You're Tearin' Down" – 2:44
 "Farther to Go" – 2:24

Charts

Weekly charts

References 

1965 songs
1965 singles
Decca Records singles
Loretta Lynn songs
Song recordings produced by Owen Bradley
Songs written by Betty Sue Perry